Habibpur is a census town in Bhagalpur district in the Indian state of Bihar.

Demographics
 India census, Habibpur had a population of 15360. Males constitute 53% of the population and females 47%. Habibpur has an average literacy rate of 85%, lower than the national average of 90.5%: male literacy is 46%, and female literacy is 79.5%. In Habibpur, 10% of the population is under 6 years of age.

References

Cities and towns in Bhagalpur district